Ardalan was a hereditary Kurdish vassaldom in western Iran from around the 14th century until 1865 or 1868 with Sanandaj as capital. The territory corresponded roughly to present-day Kurdistan Province of Iran and the rulers were loyal to the Qajar Empire. Baban was its main rival. Gorani was the literary language and lingua franca. When the vassaldom fell, literary work in Gorani ceased.

History
The ruling family of Ardalan belonged to the Bani Ardalan tribe, whose name may has been suggested to have been acquired from a Turkic rank. The ruling family considered themselves to be descended from Saladin, the founder of the Ayyubid dynasty (1171–1260/1341). Other tribal folklore stories claim that they emerged during the Sasanian (244–651) or early Abbasid (750–1258) eras. One source claims that the ruling family was descended from the first Sasanian monarch, Ardashir I. According to Sharaf al-Din Bitlisi, the renowned Kurdish historian, the earliest known leader of the tribe, Bani Ardalan, was a descendant of Nasr al-Dawla Ahmad ibn Marwan, who was the ruler of Marwanid Emirate in 1011–1061 centered in Diyar Bakr. He settled down among the Goran Kurds in Kurdistan and toward the end of the Mongol period took over the Sharazor, where he established himself as an absolute ruler.

Literature 
Under Halo Khan Ardalan and his successor Khan Ahmad Khan Ardalan, the towns of Ardalan were restored. They also supported writers and poets who wrote in Arabic, Persian, and especially Gorani, a language that was far more spoken than it is now.

See also

 Soleyman Khan Ardalan
 List of Kurdish dynasties and countries

References

Sources

 
 
 
 
 
 

 
History of Kurdistan Province
Former Kurdish states in Iran
14th-century establishments in Asia